Rashawnna Guy (born January 3, 1978), better known by her stage name Shawnna, is an American rapper. She was the first female artist signed to Def Jam South through Ludacris' Disturbing tha Peace Records. She is a former member of the female Chicago rap duo Infamous Syndicate and she is also the daughter of the blues musician Buddy Guy.

She is known for her rapid-fire delivery and her sexually explicit image and lyrics. She is one of the few female rappers to ever have a number-one song on the US Billboard Hot 100, with 2003's "Stand Up" with Ludacris.

Career

Before she recorded her first album, Shawnna was featured on the remix to the song "Loverboy" by Mariah Carey for the album and movie Glitter. She was featured in the video along with Ludacris, Da Brat, and Twenty II.

She released two albums, Worth tha Weight (2004) which produced the singles "Shake Dat Shit" and "Weight a Minute", and Block Music (2006). Before Block Music was released she released an "official prelude", Block Music: The Mixtape, with Clinton Sparks.

She was also a character in Def Jam Fight For NY in 2004.

Discography

 Worth tha Weight (2004)
 Block Music (2006)

References

External links
 Shawnna at MySpace
 Shawnna at Instagram

1978 births
Living people
American women rappers
African-American women rappers
Def Jam Recordings artists
Midwest hip hop musicians
Rappers from Chicago
21st-century American rappers
21st-century American women musicians
21st-century African-American women
21st-century African-American musicians
20th-century African-American people
20th-century African-American women
21st-century women rappers